"Out of Sight, Out of Mind" was the 101st episode of the M*A*S*H television series, and the fourth episode of the fifth season. Written by Ken Levine and David Isaacs and directed by Gene Reynolds, it first aired on October 5, 1976 and was repeated December 28, 1976. It features Hawkeye having to contend with sudden blindness after an accident. The title is a proverb.

Plot synopsis

Hawkeye is asked by the nurses to fix a malfunctioning stove in the nurses' tent. While doing so, a gas pocket builds up and explodes, flash burning and blinding Hawkeye. A specialist is called in to examine his eyes, and he is told he must keep them bandaged for a week, after which time the specialist will be able to tell whether the damage to his eyes is permanent. Hawkeye is initially despondent over the possibility of losing his sight and his surgical career. However, as the week goes on, he becomes fascinated by the stimulation of his other senses due to sensory deprivation. He also meets and bonds with patient Tom Straw (played by blind actor/singer Tom Sullivan) who was blinded in combat. He even participates in the OR; while unable to operate, he is able to give tips to the other surgeons due to his sense of smell and other clues, much to Frank's annoyance.

Frank, meanwhile, has been steadily winning money from the rest of the staff camp by betting on baseball games. The key to his success is that he cheats by listening to the games on the radio the night before, when everyone else is asleep, and then suckers people listening to the rebroadcast into betting on the losing team. Hawkeye, aware of Frank's scheme, arranges it so that Frank's radio is connected to the camp PA, and then "broadcasts" a fake Indians-Yankees ballgame into it at night, with B.J., Klinger, and Radar providing background noise. Hawkeye ends his phony broadcast with the Indians winning 5-4. When the real game's final score (Yankees won, 8-1) is broadcast over the PA the next morning, Frank notices the different outcome, inadvertently blurts out that he listened to the game last night, and the other staff members immediately begin to accost him, demanding their lost money back. 
 
Finally, the specialist returns and removes the bandages, and Hawkeye, with great relief, announces that his sight is returned. However, shortly thereafter, Hawkeye appears in the nurses' tent with his eyes bandaged again, explaining that he had a relapse. However, this turns out to be just a ruse to trick the nurses into getting undressed in his presence, one that is easily exposed when he catches a cup one of the nurses throws to him. This prompts the nurses to kick him out their tent.

External links
 

M*A*S*H (season 5) episodes
1976 American television episodes